Fanta Sacko is a Malian musician, whose debut, self-titled LP launched the bajourou music genre. She has helped establish a female singing tradition in Mali, which makes that country unique in West Africa, where female popular musicians are not generally approved of.

References

Living people
Malian musicians
Year of birth missing (living people)
21st-century Malian people